Guess Who? is a two-player board game where players each guess the identity of the other's chosen character. The game was developed by Israeli game inventors Ora and Theo Coster, also known as Theora Design, and first manufactured by Milton Bradley in 1979. It is now owned by Hasbro. The game was first brought to the UK by Jack Barr Sr. in 1982. The classic edition is currently being produced by Winning Moves Games USA.

Gameplay
Each player starts the game with a board that includes cartoon images of 24 people and their first names with all the images standing up. Each player selects a card of their choice from a separate pile of cards containing the same 24 images. The objective of the game is to be the first to determine which card one's opponent has selected. Players alternate asking various yes or no questions to eliminate candidates, such as:

 "Does your person wear a hat?"
 "Does your person wear glasses?"
 "Is your person a man?"

The player will then eliminate candidates (based on the opponent's response) by flipping those images down until only one is left. Well-crafted questions allow players to eliminate one or more possible cards.

Editions

Special editions which have different faces have been released, including Star Wars, Marvel Comics and Disney. There are smaller, "travel" editions that have only 20 different faces. In 2008 and 2010, extra and mix and match games were released. A computer game based on the series was released in 1999 by Hasbro Interactive.

Advertising
In the United States, advertisements for the board game often showed the characters on the cards coming to life and making witty comments to each other. This caused later editions of such ads to carry the spoken disclaimer line "game cards do not actually talk" to meet Federal Trade Commission advertising guidelines requiring full disclosure of toy features unable to be replicated with the actual product.

Strategy
Popular belief is that a binary search is the most efficient approach to the game, where each question halves the number of possible identities. This can be applied by asking complex questions - such as "Does your character have red hair, or glasses, or a big nose?" - where a yes or a no eliminates exactly half of the remaining characters. Such a strategy takes only four questions to reduce the field to three people, giving the fifth question a 50/50 chance of identifying the opponent's character.

The game was strongly solved by Mihai Nica in 2016. Nica's research found that while a player was ahead their optimal strategy was a binary search, and when behind they should instead make "bold plays" that had a chance of narrowing things down significantly, in order to pull ahead of the other player. Using this method, the first player has a 63% chance of winning under optimal play by both sides.

Criticism of lack of diversity
Modern commentators have noted a bias toward white and male characters in Guess Who. In 2012, a six-year-old girl wrote to Hasbro asking why there were only five female characters to choose from, against nineteen male. Hasbro's response noted that each characteristic in the game – such as wearing glasses, or having red hair – was based on a numerical equation, and deliberately appeared exactly five times. The company wrote that the game was intended to "draw attention away from using gender or ethnicity as the focal point, and to concentrate on those things that we all have in common, rather than focus on our differences".

In response to Hasbro's statement, the child's mother said that she thought identifying physical differences was "the whole point" of the game, and asked "Why is female gender regarded as a 'characteristic', while male gender is not?" The New Statesman criticized the "tone-deafness" of Hasbro's remarks. Blogger Avital Norman Nathman suggested that the decision to include five women in the game may not have been a conscious choice, and that this was a problem in itself.

Some editions of the game since the early 2000s have included more women.

The original version of Guess Who featured only one non-white character  Anne, who was redrawn in a subsequent edition as a white woman. More recently, Hasbro has redesigned the board to feature a more racially diverse set of people.

Television adaptation
A planned unscripted television adaptation of the board game was in early development at NBC and will be produced by Endemol Shine North America and Entertainment One (Hasbro's subsidiary).

People's names

References

External links
 
 Theora Design – the designers.
 

Board games introduced in 1979
Children's board games
Guessing games
1980s toys
Israeli inventions
Milton Bradley Company games
Products introduced in 1979
British board games